Paris Plane is a 1933 British crime film directed by John Paddy Carstairs and starring John Loder, Molly Lamont and Allan Jeayes. It was made at Shepperton Studios as a quota quickie.

Plot
A Scotland Yard detective pursues a murderer aboard a Paris bound Hercules plane. The murderer is disguised, making every passenger a suspect.

Cast
 John Loder 
 Molly Lamont 
 Allan Jeayes 
 Barry Livesey 
 Julie Suedo 
 Edwin Ellis
 James Harcourt 
 Eileen Munro

Critical reception
TV Guide gave the film two out of five stars, calling it "A claustrophobic thriller...A fairly interesting crime film that exploits its low budget successfully by containing the action in one enclosed area."

References

Bibliography
 Low, Rachael. Filmmaking in 1930s Britain. George Allen & Unwin, 1985.
 Wood, Linda. British Films, 1927-1939. British Film Institute, 1986.

External links
Paris Plane at IMDb

1933 films
1933 crime films
British crime films
Films directed by John Paddy Carstairs
Films set in London
Quota quickies
Films shot at Shepperton Studios
British black-and-white films
1930s English-language films
1930s British films